Credins Bank was established in Albania in March 2003 by a group of businessmen as the first private bank with Albanian capital. The head office is located in Tirana.

In 2012, Credins Bank had a 7.9% market share.

At the end of 2017, the bank has a network of 59 branches and 63 ATM, totaling over 120 locations in Albania. The bank is today the 2nd largest bank in the country in terms of total assests and the 1st or the biggest one in the loan portofolio. Since 2020 Credins Bank has expanded in Kosovo, numbering today 7 branches.

In November 2017, British-based Amryta Capital LLP bought a 14.9% stake in the bank.

Artan Santo, Credins Bank's manager and one of its founders and shareholders, was shot dead in Tirana in 2014.

Sources

Banks of Albania
Banks established in 2003
Albanian brands